Crazy in Alabama is a 1999 American comedy-drama film directed by Antonio Banderas and based on Mark Childress' 1993 novel of the same name. The film stars Melanie Griffith as an abused housewife who becomes an actress, while her nephew deals with a racially motivated murder involving a corrupt sheriff. It marked Dakota Johnson's film debut.

Plot
In 1965 Alabama, Peter Joseph "Peejoe" Bullis lives in a small town at the height of the Civil Rights Movement. Peejoe's eccentric Aunt Lucille Vinson kills her husband Chester with poison, after suffering years of abuse. She decapitates him and brings his severed head with her en route to Hollywood, where she is convinced that television stardom awaits her. In New Orleans, Lucille buys a black hat box to store Chester's head. When a bartender on Bourbon Street insults her, she threatens him with a revolver and robs the cash register before stealing his car. Back in Alabama, Peejoe's uncle (Lucille's brother), Dove, a local funeral director, is notified of the incident. While traveling, Lucille becomes increasingly paranoid, convincing Chester's ghost is haunting her.

Meanwhile, Peejoe becomes involved with a group of black students protesting the town's racially segregated municipal swimming pool, leading to a protest that explodes into deadly violence. A young black boy, Taylor Jackson, is killed by the town sheriff, John Doggett. Peejoe, the only witness, is pressured by the sheriff to keep it quiet. While mowing his lawn, Peejoe is struck in the eye with a rock; the townspeople circulate a false story that he was shot in retaliation for Taylor's death. The black townspeople stage a protest honoring Taylor in which they enter the swimming pool. Peejoe and his brother, Wiley, join them in support, but the protest is interrupted by police and white pro-Confederates.

Lucille wins $32,000 in Las Vegas while playing roulette at a casino, and subsequently pays for a personal driver, Norman, to bring her to Los Angeles. She arrives in Hollywood, taking the stage name Carolyn Clay, and manages to land a minor role on Bewitched. Back in Alabama, Peejoe and Wiley attend a speech by Martin Luther King Jr., and Peejoe's racist aunt Earline grows infuriated over the publicity involving the family. While watching television one night, they are all surprised to see Lucille on television.

At an industry party in the Hollywood Hills, hostess Joan Blake discovers Chester's severed head in Lucille's hat box. Lucille flees with Norman to San Francisco, and tries to get rid of the head by throwing it off the Golden Gate Bridge. Two policemen, thinking she is attempting suicide, stop her and discover the head. She is arrested and escorted back to Alabama for her trial, where she is met by a media circus. In the local jail, Lucille is incarcerated in a cell next to Nehemiah Jackson, Taylor's father who has been jailed over the protest.

After being convicted of first-degree murder, Lucille is sentenced to twenty years in prison. However, the sentence is suspended when she earns the judge's sympathies after testifying to the abuse she received, and she is put on a five-year probation with the condition that she seek psychiatric help. Lucille, her children, and all her friends joyfully exit the courtroom while the sheriff (through Peejoe's testimony) is put under arrest for Taylor's murder.

Cast

Production
The film was shot in Houma, Louisiana, Schriever, Chackbay, New Orleans, Las Vegas, San Francisco and Los Angeles.

Reception
The film received mixed-to-negative reviews from critics, scoring a 30% approval rating on Rotten Tomatoes based on 56 reviews, with the site's consensus stating: "Melanie Griffith gets kudos for her performance, but the movie just doesn't seem to come together." The film holds a score of 46 out of 100 on Metacritic based on 27 reviews.

Roger Ebert of the Chicago Sun-Times called the film "an ungainly fit of three stories that have no business being shoehorned into the same movie," awarding it two out of four stars. Janet Maslin of The New York Times wrote that the film "takes an antic tone. It presents Melanie Griffith as the kind of fanciful creature who looks flirty even on her Wanted poster, and whose escapades en route to Hollywood have a dizzy spin." Paula Nechak of the Seattle Post-Intelligencer called the film "funny, eccentric, and touchingly just, combining a unique interpretation of the time with an offbeat sense of humor."

Griffith earned a Razzie Award nomination for Worst Actress for her performance in the film but lost out to Heather Donahue for The Blair Witch Project. However, her performance for the film and Another Day in Paradise earned her the Sant Jordi Award for Best Foreign Actress. Lucas Black was nominated for the Young Artist Award for Best Performance in a Feature Film - Leading Young Actor and YoungStar Award for Best Young Actor/Performance in a Motion Picture Drama. Banderas won the 2000 ALMA award for Outstanding Director of a Feature Film, the European Film Award for Outstanding European Achievement in World Cinema, and was nominated for a Golden Lion.

See also
 Civil rights movement in popular culture

References

External links
 
 
 
 

1999 films
1990s crime comedy-drama films
Civil rights movement in film
American crime comedy-drama films
Columbia Pictures films
Films scored by Mark Snow
Films about race and ethnicity
Films based on American novels
Films directed by Antonio Banderas
Films set in 1965
Films set in Alabama
Films set in San Francisco
Films shot in the Las Vegas Valley
Films shot in Los Angeles
Films shot in Louisiana
Films shot in New Orleans
Films shot in San Francisco
Films produced by Debra Hill
Poisoning in film
Mariticide in fiction
1999 directorial debut films
1990s English-language films
1990s American films